The  Washington Redskins season was the franchise's 29th season in the National Football League.  The team failed to improve on their 3–9 record from 1959 and finished last-place in the NFL Eastern Conference, with a 1–9–2 record under second-year head coach Mike Nixon.  The Redskins' only win that season was a 26–14 victory against the first-year expansionists Dallas Cowboys team on October 9 in Washington.

This season was also the last one in their old stadium, Griffith Stadium.  Following the season, the Redskins fired Mike Nixon, and replaced him with Bill McPeak.

Regular season

Schedule

Standings

Roster

References

Washington
Washington Redskins seasons
Washing